Bobcaygeon/Chesher Lakehurst Aerodrome  is an aerodrome located  east southeast of Bobcaygeon, Ontario, Canada.

References

Registered aerodromes in Ontario
Buildings and structures in Kawartha Lakes